David McLean is a Scottish advocate and cricket umpire. He is a member of the Development Panel of ICC Umpires. McLean played as a wicket-keeper in local domestic cricket in Scotland, becoming an umpire in 2014. He stood in his first One Day International (ODI) match, between Scotland and Sri Lanka on 21 May 2019. He stood in his first Twenty20 International (T20I) match, between Scotland and the Netherlands on 16 September 2019.

In January 2022, he was named as one of the on-field umpires for the 2022 ICC Under-19 Cricket World Cup in the West Indies.

See also
 List of One Day International cricket umpires
 List of Twenty20 International cricket umpires

References

External links
 

Year of birth missing (living people)
Living people
Scottish One Day International cricket umpires
Scottish Twenty20 International cricket umpires
Place of birth missing (living people)